Aromanticism is the debut studio album by American singer-songwriter Moses Sumney. It was released on September 22, 2017, by Jagjaguwar. It is a concept album about "lovelessness as a sonic dreamscape" that "seeks to interrogate the idea that romance is normative and necessary." The record was written and produced by Sumney, with assistance from numerous musicians. It features new versions of two previously-released songs, "Plastic" and "Lonely World".

Composition
The songs on Aromanticism have been seen as chamber songs with "nocturnal-sounding" arrangements. It is also a "heady mélange" that mixes folk and soul music with jazz harmonies.

Critical reception

Aromanticism received widespread acclaim from critics. At Metacritic, which assigns a normalized rating out of 100 to reviews from mainstream publications, the album received an average score of 85, based on 15 reviews. Brian Josephs of Spin gave a positive review, stating, "The dreamy project leaves the snide social critiques and radicalisms to the wayside for 36 minutes that feel of its own realm, where the dichotomies and bodily desire feel self-contained. The intimacy is never lost within the set's high concept: For an album centered on lonesomeness, AROMANTICISM feels warm." Aromanticism was named "Best New Music", with Pitchfork reviewer Jason King calling it "a musical detoxification from the exhausting stream of information that now constitutes a normal day of news." In his review, Greg Kot of the Chicago Tribune wrote: "The songs run together, serene yet troubled, beautiful yet bruised. They are built to linger." Nina Corcoran of Consequence of Sound praised the album, stating: "It requires multiple listens. In turn, that helps the listener grow, revealing spaces where their own narrative and experiences can intertwine with his—not in a romantic sense, but in an educational sense. As a result, Aromanticism already has become and promises to remain one of the most emotionally therapeutic albums of the year."

The Los Angeles Times called it "breathtakingly beautiful", writing, "Sumney places layer upon layer of his voice into tracks until he achieves Beach Boys-esque harmony." Anna Alger of Exclaim! said: "With Aromanticism, Moses Sumney creates a harmonious world in which he speaks from a position that isn't often recognized. Sumney approaches the complexities of relationships, power structures and an inability to experience romantic love with a quiet, powerful confidence." Harriet Gibsone of The Guardian wrote: "When music sounds this complete and absorbing, it's a wonder we waste our lives chasing coexistence with sweaty, needy humans anyway." Kitty Empire of The Observer gave the album a positive review, calling Sumney's falsetto "celestial" but felt the underuse of his lower register was a drawback. Shahzaib Hussain of Clash echoed the same sentiment, calling Sumney's lower register "a cottony, sinewy part of his arsenal reduced to a mere cameo."

Accolades

Track listing
Credits are adapted from the album's liner notes.

Notes
  signifies an additional producer.

Personnel

Musicians
 Moses Sumney – vocals, bass guitar , guitar , synthesizers 
 Rob Moose – string arrangement and performance 
 Miguel Atwood-Ferguson – string arrangement and performance 
 Brandee Younger – harp 
 Rashaan Carter – upright bass 
 Jamire Williams – drums 
 Thundercat – bass guitar 
 Paris Strother – piano and synthesizer arrangements 
 Joshua Willing Halpern – guitar 
 Mike Rocha – horns 
 Ian Chang – drums 
 Tosin Abasi – guitar 
 Tracy Wannomae – flute , clarinet 
 Nicole Miglis – flute 
 Matt Otto – synthesizers 
 Ludwig Göransson – guitar , bass guitar , synthesizer 

Engineers
 Joshua Willing Halpern – engineering , mixing 
 Matt Otto – engineering 
 Michael Harris – engineering 
 Rashaan Carter – engineering 
 Moses Sumney – engineering 
 Gueorgui Linev – engineering 
 Billy Mims – engineering 
 Trayer Tryon – engineering 
 Ben Baptie – mixing 
 Ted Jensen – mastering

Artwork
 Eric Gyamfi – photography
 Sean Walker – additional photography 
 Julian Gross – design

Charts

References

2017 debut albums
Moses Sumney albums
Jagjaguwar albums